The New Taipei Municipal Banqiao Senior High School is a high school in Banqiao District, New Taipei, Taiwan. It is the top high school in New Taipei City.

Introduction
The school was founded in September, 1946, with the name Taipei County Banqiao Junior High School. It was also called “Garden of Lindens”, for there were once two ancient linden trees.

In 1950 Banqiao Junior High School turned into senior high school. The current school, including junior and senior high, was formally established in 1952. The same year it was restructured and titled Taiwan Provincial Banqiao Senior High School. In 2000 the school was renamed National Banqiao Senior High School.

In 2002, due to the rising status of New Taipei City from Taipei County, the school was renamed New Taipei City Panciao High School. There are 61 classes, composed of male and female students. Among them, there are three classes for mathematical gifted students, and one class for both mentally and physically disabled students.

History
 Taipei County, Taiwan Province Banqiao  High School (1946-1952)
 Taiwan Provincial Banqiao Junior High School (1952-1970)
 Taiwan Provincial Banqiao  senior High School (1970-2000)
 National Banqiao Senior High School (2000-2012)
 Banqiao Senior High School (2013 -)

School anthem
The Banqiao senior high school song is by Luo-Shoushu lyrics, Lin-Dongzhe composition as follows:(sound)

Chinese lyrics
遠山聳翠，淡水溶溶，吾校秀毓而靈鍾；

規模宏廓，校風肅雍，絃歌載誦樂融融。

我們要實踐倫理，化俗移風，我們要篤行民主，天下為公，我們要精研科學，征服太空！

同學們，熱愛我們的國家，必孝必忠，負起我們的責任，亦毅亦弘，爭取我們的榮譽，為聖為雄。

看，古今中外，有志者畢竟成功。
(in English, as well, please)

Notable alumni

Economy 
 Terry Gou: Group Chairman of Hon Hai.
 Yan-Ming Cai: Group Chairman of Wang-Zhong.
 Lin, Hong-Ming: Taipei 101 Company General Manager and Chairman.

Education
Liao Jinshun: Banqiao Senior High School Alumni Association President, former State representative
Lin Shiming: MESAN University of Science and Technology
Ma Chengmin: Mingchi University of Technology Dean
Huang Wanju: Taipei Municipal University of Education Dean
Chen Weihong: former President of Taipei City lishangaozhong, currently founding principal
Dai zhicheng: former guangrengaozhong President
Unique treasurehouse: Academia Sinica's Institute of modern history adjunct researcher, National Taiwan Normal University Professor
Liao Nian Fu: the Taipei century Symphony Orchestra Music Director, National Taiwan University of Arts, Professor of music
Qian Nan chapters: contemporary composers, National Taipei University of the arts, Professor of music
Lin Rongcong: Taipei municipal Songshan advertising design Panel Chair
Xu Zhenghang: Chung Yuan Christian University Professor of mechanical engineering

Transportation
The school is accessible within walking distance north of Fuzhong Station of Taipei Metro.

See also 
 Education in Taiwan
 List of schools in Taiwan
 High School

References

External links

 School Website 
 School Website
 Home page of Ministry Of Education

1946 establishments in Taiwan
Educational institutions established in 1946
High schools in Taiwan
Schools in New Taipei
Banqiao District